Yakshina is a rural locality (a village) in Plesetsky District, Arkhangelsk Oblast, Russia. The population was 18 as of 2010.

Geography 
Yakshina is located on the Puksa River, 114 km east of Plesetsk (the district's administrative centre) by road. Yurmala is the nearest rural locality.

References 

Rural localities in Plesetsky District